MBC Networks (Pvt) Ltd is a Sri Lankan media company which owns five national radio stations - Shakthi FM, Sirasa FM, Yes FM, Y FM and Legends FM. The company was established in 1993 by the Capital Maharaja conglomerate.

References

 
Mass media companies established in 1993
Privately held companies of Sri Lanka